Tell al-Daman  is a Syrian village located in Mount Simeon District, Aleppo. According to the Syria Central Bureau of Statistics (CBS), Tell al-Daman had a population of 872 in the 2004 census.

References 

Populated places in Mount Simeon District